Samuel Slater (June 9, 1768 – April 21, 1835) was an early English-American industrialist known as the "Father of the American Industrial Revolution", a phrase coined by Andrew Jackson, and the "Father of the American Factory System". In the United Kingdom, he was called "Slater the Traitor" and "Sam the Slate" because he brought British textile technology to the United States, modifying it for American use. He stole the textile factory machinery designs as an apprentice to a pioneer in the British industry before migrating to the U.S. at the age of 21. 

Slater designed the first textile mills in the U.S. and later went into business for himself, developing a family business with his sons. He eventually owned 13 spinning mills and had developed tenant farms and company towns around his textile mills, such as Slatersville, Rhode Island.

Early life and education
Slater was born in Belper, Derbyshire, England, to William and Elizabeth Slater, on June 9, 1768, the fifth son in a farming family of eight children. He received a basic education, perhaps at a school run by Thomas Jackson. At age ten, he began work at the cotton mill opened that year by Jedediah Strutt using the water frame pioneered by Richard Arkwright at nearby Cromford Mill. In 1782, his father died, and his family indentured Samuel as an apprentice to Strutt. Slater was well trained by Strutt and, by age 21, he had gained a thorough knowledge of the organization and practice of cotton spinning.

He learned of the American interest in developing similar machines, and he was also aware of British law against exporting the designs. He, therefore, memorized as much as he could and departed for New York in 1789. Some people of Belper called him "Slater the Traitor", as they considered his move a betrayal of the town where many earned their living at Strutt's mills.

American factories 

In 1789, Rhode Island-based industrialist Moses Brown moved to Pawtucket, Rhode Island to operate a mill in partnership with his son-in-law William Almy and cousin Smith-Brown. Almy & Brown, as the company was to be called, was housed in a former fulling mill near the Pawtucket Falls of the Blackstone River. They planned to manufacture cloth for sale, with yarn to be spun on spinning wheels, jennies, and frames, using water power. In August, they acquired a 32-spindle frame "after the Arkwright pattern" but could not operate it. At this point, Slater wrote to them, offering his services. Slater realized that nothing could be done with the machinery as it stood and convinced Brown of his knowledge. He promised: "If I do not make a good yarn, as they do in England, I will have nothing for my services but will throw the whole of what I have attempted over the bridge." In 1790, he signed a contract with Brown to replicate the British designs. Their deal provided Slater the funds to build the water frames and associated machinery, with a half share in their capital value and the profits derived from them. By December, the shop was operational with ten to twelve workers. By 1791, Slater had some machinery in operation, despite shortages of tools and skilled mechanics. In 1793, Slater and Brown opened their first factory in Pawtucket.

Slater knew the secret of Arkwright's success—namely, that account had to be taken of varying fiber lengths—but he also understood Arkwright's carding, drawing, and roving machines. He also had the experience of working with all the elements as a continuous production system. During construction, Slater made some adjustments to the designs to fit local needs. The result was the first successful water-powered roller spinning textile mill in America.

After developing this mill, Slater instituted management principles that he had learned from Strutt and Arkwright to teach workers to be skilled mechanics.

In 1812, Slater built the Old Green Mill, later known as Cranston Print Works, in East Village in Webster, Massachusetts. He moved to Webster due in part to an available workforce, but also due to abundant water power from Webster Lake.

Management style 

Slater created the Rhode Island System, which were factory practices based upon family life patterns in New England villages. Children aged seven to 12 were the first employees of the mill; Slater personally supervised them closely. The first child workers were hired in 1790.

He brought in whole families, developing entire villages. He provided company-owned housing nearby, along with company stores; he sponsored a Sunday School where college students taught the children reading and writing.

Expansion 
Slater constructed a new mill in 1793 for the sole purpose of textile manufacture under Almy, Brown & Slater, as he was now partners with Almy and Brown. It was a 72-spindle mill; the patenting of Eli Whitney's cotton gin in 1794 reduced the labor in processing cotton. It also enabled profitable cultivation of short-staple cotton, which could be grown in the interior uplands, resulting in a dramatic expansion of cotton cultivation throughout the Deep South in the antebellum years. The New England mills and their labor force of free men depended on southern cotton based on slave labor. Slater also brought the Sunday school system from his native England to his textile factory at Pawtucket.

In 1798, Samuel Slater split from Almy and Brown, forming Samuel Slater & Company in partnership with his father-in-law Oziel Wilkinson. They developed other mills in Rhode Island, Massachusetts, Connecticut, and New Hampshire.

In 1799, he was joined by his brother John Slater from England. John was a wheelwright who had spent time studying the latest English developments and might well have gained experience of the spinning mule. Samuel put John Slater in charge of a large mill called the White Mill.

By 1810, Slater held part ownership in three factories in Massachusetts and Rhode Island. In 1823, he bought a mill in Connecticut. He also built factories to make the textile manufacturing machinery used by many of the region's mills and formed a partnership with his brother-in-law to produce iron for use in machinery construction. But Slater spread himself too thin and was unable to coordinate or integrate his many different business interests. He refused to go outside his family to hire managers, and, after 1829, he made his sons partners in the new umbrella firm of Samuel Slater and Sons. His son Horatio Nelson Slater completely reorganized the family business, introduced cost-cutting measures, and giving up old-fashioned procedures. Slater & Company became one of the leading manufacturing companies in the United States.  Due to the oppressive rules and working conditions and a proposed cut of 25% in the wages of women workers by Slater and the other Mill Owners near Pawtucket, in 1824, this area was the site of the first factory strike in US history. Thus beginning the long struggle for human rights between factory workers and owners, which is continuing today.

Slater also hired recruiters to search for families willing to work at the mill. He advertised to attract more families to the mills.

Industrialization 

By 1800, the Slater mill's success had been duplicated by other entrepreneurs. By 1810, Secretary of the Treasury Albert Gallatin reported that the U.S. had some 50 cotton-yarn mills, many of them started in response to the Embargo of 1807 that cut off imports from Britain before the War of 1812. That war resulted in speeding up the process of industrialization in New England. By war's end in 1815, there were 140 cotton manufacturers within 30 miles of Providence, employing 26,000 hands and operating 130,000 spindles. The American textile industry was launched.

Personal life 
In 1791, Slater married Hannah Wilkinson; she invented two-ply thread, becoming, in 1793, the first American woman to be granted a patent. Samuel and Hannah had ten children together, although four died during infancy. Hannah died in 1812 from complications of childbirth, leaving Samuel with six young children to raise. Along with his brother, Samuel started the Slater family in America.

Slater married for a second time in 1817 to a widow, Esther Parkinson. As his business was extremely successful by this time, and as Parkinson also owned the property before their marriage, the couple had a pre-nuptial agreement prepared.

Slater died on April 21, 1835, in Webster, Massachusetts, a town which he had founded in 1832 and named for his friend Senator Daniel Webster. He is buried in Mount Zion Cemetery. At the time of his death, he owned 13 mills and was worth US$1.3 million, the equivalent in 2022 of US$42 million.

Legacy and honors 

Slater's original mill still stands, known today as Slater Mill and listed on the National Register of Historic Places. It is operated as a museum dedicated to preserving Samuel Slater's history and his contribution to American industry. Slater's original mill in Pawtucket and the town of Slatersville are both parts of the Blackstone River Valley National Historical Park, which was created to preserve and interpret the history of the industrial development of the region.

His papers are held at the Harvard Business School's Baker Library.

Samuel Slater Experience, a history museum dedicated to his life and legacy located in Webster, Massachusetts, opened in March 2022.

References 

Bibliography
Cameron, Edward H. Samuel Slater, Father of American Manufactures (1960) scholarly biography
 Conrad, Jr., James L. "'Drive That Branch': Samuel Slater, the Power Loom, and the Writing of America's Textile History", Technology and Culture, Vol. 36, No. 1 (Jan. 1995), pp. 1–28 in JSTOR
 Everett et al. (Slater Study Group) (2006) "Samuel Slater – Hero or Traitor?" Milford, Derbyshire: Maypole Promotions. Formative years in Derbyshire.
 Tucker, Barbara M. "The Merchant, the Manufacturer, and the Factory Manager: The Case of Samuel Slater", Business History Review, Vol. 55, No. 3 (Autumn, 1981), pp. 297–313 in JSTOR
 Tucker, Barbara M. Samuel Slater and the Origins of the American Textile Industry, 1790–1860 (1984)
 Tucker, Barbara M., and Kenneth H. Tucker. Industrializing Antebellum America: The Rise of Manufacturing Entrepreneurs in the Early Republic (2008)
White, George S. Memoir of Samuel Slater: The Father of American Manufactures (1836, repr. 1967)

External links 

 Slater Mill website
 Slater Mill, Sarah Leavitt, Arcadia Publishing, 1997 
 VIDEO "Samuel Slater – Hero or Traitor?" (2006) Maypole Promotions
Slater family business records at Baker Library Special Collections, Harvard Business School
Samuel Slater Experience website

1768 births
1835 deaths
American industrialists
People from Pawtucket, Rhode Island
People from Belper
English emigrants to the United States
American textile industry businesspeople